Graziana pupula is a species of minute freshwater snail with an operculum, aquatic gastropod molluscs or micromolluscs in the family Hydrobiidae. Distribution of this species include Austria, Italy and Slovenia.

References

Hydrobiidae
Graziana
Gastropods described in 1886
Taxonomy articles created by Polbot